Graham v. Connor, 490 U.S. 386 (1989), was a United States Supreme Court case in which the Court determined that an objective reasonableness standard should apply to a civilian's claim that law enforcement officials used excessive force in the course of making an arrest, investigatory stop, or other "seizure" of his or her person.

Background 
Dethorne Graham traveled with a friend to a convenience store to buy orange juice to counteract an insulin reaction Graham was experiencing. Graham entered the store, but quickly left because the line was too long. Returning to his friend's vehicle, they then drove away from the store. Connor, a nearby police officer, observed Graham's behavior and became suspicious. Connor then pulled them over for an investigative stop.

Although Graham's friend told police that Graham was simply suffering from a “sugar reaction,” the officer ordered Graham to wait while he found out what, if anything, had happened at the convenience store. When Officer Connor returned to his patrol car to call for backup assistance, Graham got out of the car, ran around it twice, and finally sat down on the curb, where he passed out briefly.

In the ensuing confusion, a number of other Charlotte police officers arrived on the scene in response to Officer Connor's request for backup. One of the officers rolled Graham over on the sidewalk and cuffed his hands tightly behind his back, ignoring Berry's pleas to get him some sugar. Another officer said: “I've seen a lot of people with sugar diabetes that never acted like this. Ain't nothing wrong with the M.F. but drunk. Lock the S.B. up.”

During the police encounter, Graham suffered a broken foot, cuts on his wrists, a bruised forehead, and an injured shoulder. He filed a federal lawsuit against Officer Connor and other officers alleging that the officers' use of force during the investigative stop was excessive and violated Graham's civil rights.

The outcome of the case was the creation of an "objective reasonableness test" when examining an officer's actions. That test, over time via case law, would evolve to something that could be summed up as "given the facts known at the time, would a similarly trained and experienced officer respond in a similar fashion".

Decision
The Supreme Court held that determining the "reasonableness" of a seizure "requires a careful balancing of the nature and quality of the intrusion on the individual's Fourth Amendment interests against the countervailing governmental interests at stake". It acknowledged, "Our Fourth Amendment jurisprudence has long recognized that the right to make an arrest or investigatory stop necessarily carries with it the right to use some degree of physical coercion or threat thereof to effect it." However, it then noted, "Because the test of reasonableness under the Fourth Amendment is not capable of precise definition or mechanical application," the test's "proper application requires careful attention to the facts and circumstances of each particular case.

The Court rejected the notion that the judiciary could use the Due Process Clause, instead of the Fourth Amendment, in analyzing an excessive force claim: "Because the Fourth Amendment provides an explicit textual source of constitutional protection against this sort of physically intrusive governmental conduct, that Amendment, not the more generalized notion of 'substantive due process', must be the guide for analyzing these claims."

The Court then explained that, "As in other Fourth Amendment contexts... the "reasonableness" inquiry in an excessive force case is an objective one: the question is whether the officers' actions are 'objectively reasonable' in light of the facts and circumstances confronting them, without regard to their underlying intent or motivation." The Court also cautioned, "The "reasonableness" of a particular use of force must be judged from the perspective of a reasonable officer on the scene, rather than with the 20/20 vision of hindsight."

The Court then outlined a non-exhaustive list of factors for determining when an officer's use of force is objectively reasonable: "the severity of the crime at issue", "whether the suspect poses an immediate threat to the safety of the officers or others", and "whether he is actively resisting arrest or attempting to evade arrest by flight".

Having established the proper framework for excessive force claims, the Court explained that the Court of Appeals had applied a test that focused on an officer's subjective motivations, rather than whether he had used an objectively unreasonable amount of force. The Court then reversed the Court of Appeals' judgement and remanded the case for reconsideration that used the proper Fourth Amendment standard.

Impact 
Many high-profile cases of alleged use of excessive force by a law enforcement officer have been decided based on the framework set out by Graham v. Connor, including those in which a civilian was killed by an officer: shooting of Michael Brown, shooting of Jonathan Ferrell, shooting of John Crawford III, shooting of Samuel DuBose, shooting of Jamar Clark, shooting of Keith Lamont Scott, shooting of Terence Crutcher, shooting of Alton Sterling, shooting of Philando Castile. In most of these cases, the officer's actions were deemed to pass the reasonableness test. This case was also repeatedly cited by both the prosecution and defense in State v. Chauvin regarding the murder of George Floyd, including by University of South Carolina professor Seth Stoughton, who compiled a 100-page report on the case as a prosecution expert.

Some media praise the precedent set by Graham v. Connor for enforcing police officers' rights to perform their duties without suffering injury and recognizing the dangers inherent to their work. Critics view the framework it created as unjust based on the large number of high-profile acquittals it has allowed, not permitting hindsight knowledge to be considered in a case, and allowing for racial biases to weigh on the verdict.

See also 
 List of United States Supreme Court cases, volume 490
 Tennessee v. Garner
 Mullenix v. Luna
 Davis v. City of Las Vegas (9th Cir. 2007)

References

Further reading 
 
 
 Graham v. Connor and objective reasonableness standard, available at The Lex-Warrier: Online Law Journal, ISSN (O): 2319-8338

External links
 
 

United States Supreme Court cases
United States Supreme Court cases of the Rehnquist Court
1989 in United States case law
Law enforcement use of force